Claire Maxwell may refer to:

 Claire Maxwell (sociologist) (born 1975), sociologist
 Claire Maxwell (netball) (born 1988), Scottish netball player